Recreational Love is the fourth studio album by the American indie pop duo The Bird and the Bee, released by Rostrum Records on July 10, 2015. The first single, "Will You Dance?" was released on May 5, 2015.

Track listing

References

2015 albums
Albums produced by Greg Kurstin
The Bird and the Bee albums
Rostrum Records albums